The 2015 Little League World Series was held in South Williamsport, Pennsylvania, from August 21 until August 30, 2015. Eight teams from the United States and eight from throughout the world competed in the 69th edition of the tournament. The Tokyo Kitasuna Little League from Tokyo, Japan, defeated Red Land Little League of Lewisberry, Pennsylvania, in the championship game, 18–11, which was the most total runs scored (29) in any final game. It was Japan's fourth title in the past six years. The tournament was originally scheduled to begin on August 20, however, inclement weather resulted in the postponement of all first-day games, resulting in eight games being played on August 21, a LLWS first.

Teams

Republic of China, commonly known as Taiwan, due to complicated relations with People's Republic of China, is recognized by the name Chinese Taipei by majority of international organizations including Little League Baseball (LLB). For more information, please see Cross-Strait relations.

Results

The draw to determine the opening round pairings took place on June 10, 2015.

United States bracket

International bracket

Crossover games
Teams that lose their first two games get to play a crossover game against a team from the other side of the bracket that also lost its first two games. These games are labeled Game A and Game B.

Third place game
The third place game is played between the loser of the United States championship and the loser of the International championship.

World Championship

Champions path
The Kitasuna LL reached the LLWS with an undefeated record of eight wins and no losses. In total, their record was 13-0

References

 
Little League World Series
Little League World Series
Little League World Series